Somsak Prissanananthakul (born April 27, 1951) is a Thai politician. He served as Minister of Education, Minister of Agriculture and Cooperatives, and chief advisor of Chartthaipattana Party. In 2007 he criticized NRC members for focusing their campaign on removing Thaksin Shinawatra members. In 2008 he vowed to fight gaming addiction and promised to reduce it by 70% within 90 days by using more than 1000 Royal Thai Police officials to police gaming shops in Bangkok. In 2010 he was defeated by Thaksin Shinawatra in Thai General Elections. On October 14, 2013, he chaired as a Deputy House Speaker and suggested Samak Sundaravej to think through about his ban on freedom of speech. On March 26, 2014, he said that his country will be ready to join Association of Southeast Asian Nations in 100 days.

References

Living people
20th-century births
Somsak Prissanananthakul
Year of birth missing (living people)
Somsak Prissanananthakul
Somsak Prissanananthakul